New Art Exchange is a contemporary art gallery in Nottingham's Hyson Green neighborhood representing contexts of Black, Asian, and minority ethnic artists and communities. The organisation formed as a charity in 2003 from APNA Arts (a South Asian arts groups) created by Parbinder Singh and EMACA (East Midlands African Caribbean Arts), which educationalist and historian Len Garrison helped to establish.

Architecture 
The building was designed by architects Hawkins\Brown. It opened in 2008, replacing the old Art Exchange building that was previously known as The People’s Dispensary. It was officially opened by Laura Dyer from Arts Council England, Michael Williams from Nottingham City Council, and artist Hew Locke on 5 September 2008. In 2009/10 The New Art Exchange building won five design & architecture awards including RIBA’s (Royal Institute of British Architects) National Award, RIBA East Midlands Award, The City of Nottingham Lord Mayor’s Awards for Urban Design (New Build) & Overall Winner, and East Midlands National Civic Trust Award.

Events 
New Art Exchange hosted Nottingham Mela 2018 
New Art Exchange hosted Nottingham Mela 2017

Projects 
The New Art Exchange successfully ran 'The Culture Cloud' project for The Digital R&D Fund for Arts and Culture that Nesta and the AHRC Fund. 40,000 votes were cast by the public for the 101 shortlisted art works and the Top 40 are now on display online and, as of this week, in the NAE's gallery space in Nottingham.

Further reading 
Oxborrow, Lynn; Elijah, Ayodeji; and Lawton, Christopher, "Creative and Digital D2N2," Creative Quarter Company, December 2015 (http://www.d2n2lep.org/write/Documents/Creative_and_Digital_D2N2_Sector_Plan.pdf)

References

External links 
 
 Creating Monument Symposium

Arts centres in England
Art museums and galleries in Nottinghamshire